Łukasz Kubot and Oliver Marach chose to not defend their 2008 title.
Sadik Kadir and Purav Raja defeated Andis Juška and Deniss Pavlovs 6–3, 7–6(4) in the final.

Seeds

Draw

Draw

References
 Doubles Draw

Karshi Challenger - Doubles
Karshi Challenger